The Playground Theater is the only continuously operating non-profit theater in Chicago dedicated to Modern Theatrical Improvisation, a form of theater invented in the city.  The Playground was founded in 1997 by its original member companies. Located on Halsted Street, The Playground features performances every night.

The theater exists as a non-profit co-op, governed by its member companies, or "teams." The Playground currently is home to over 12 house teams in addition to guest teams, and members of the theater's Incubator Program.

From time to time the theater holds auditions for its signature Incubator Program, in which applicants are judged on their skills at scene-based improvised comedy.  Those who pass are assembled into Incubator Teams with a certain guaranteed number of shows on The Playground's stage.  The newly hatched teams are then free to govern their own fates, hire their own coaches, and generally pursue a career as an improv ensemble.  Some Incubator teams eventually wind up applying for membership status with the theater.

The Playground launched Playground Theatricals in 2015 with the production of Don Chipotle, an original play written by Juan Villa. Playground Theater was created to provide a venue for Chicago's improvisers to have more artistic control over the work they produce.

At the end of 2016, The Playground Theater announced the launch of a new program for writers, directors and performers called MOSAIC. MOSAIC  which will focus on artists exploring individual identity and celebrating uniqueness. MOSIAC accepted a 7-month MOSAIC writer and production residency will run in association with The Department of Cultural Affairs at the Chicago Cultural Center. MOSAIC will begin accepting submissions for COMEDY and THEATRICAL productions in 2016.

See also

 List of improvisational theatre companies

References

External links
 The Playground's web site

Improvisational theatre
Theatres in Chicago
Comedy clubs in the United States